Gregory de Vink (6 July 1998 – 4 September 2020) was a South African racing cyclist.

Biography
In 2015, de Vink was champion of the Junior African Road Championships in road race and time trial. He also won the South African National Time Trial Championships at junior level. In September of that year, he finished 42nd in the time trial at the 2015 UCI Road World Championships in Richmond, Virginia, more than four minutes behind winner Leo Appelt.

De Vink moved to the under-23 category in 2017 and joined the new team Leadout Aspire. During that summer, he participated in a few events in Belgium, winning in Sint-Niklaas on 22 July. The next year, he signed with the French team Vélo Club La Pomme Marseille. That year, he scored 3rd place at the South African Championships in the U21 category. On 14 July, he finished 8th in the Grand Prix de Charvieu-Chavagneux. Fifteen days later, he took 2nd in the Grand Prix de Cabannes, behind his teammate Jonathan Couanon. In September, he finished 3rd in the Tour de Maurice.

In 2019, de Vink competed at the Provincial Championships of Western Cape, finishing 2nd in the time trial. He was also co-champion of the South African National Road Race Championships. Upon his return to France, he finished 12th in the final stage of the Boucles du Haut-Var.

Death
Gregory de Vink died in a motorcycle accident on 4 September 2020 at the age of 22.

Major results

2015
 African Junior Road Championships
1st  Time trial
1st  Team time trial
 1st  Time trial, National Junior Road Championships
2016
 1st  Time trial, National Junior Road Championships
2018
 3rd Time trial, National Under-23 Road Championships
2019
 2nd Time trial, National Under-23 Road Championships

References

External links

1998 births
2020 deaths
South African male cyclists
People from Somerset West
Place of death missing
Afrikaner people
Motorcycle road incident deaths
Road incident deaths in South Africa
Sportspeople from the Western Cape